Sharron Elizabeth Davies,  (born 1 November 1962) is an English former competitive swimmer who represented Great Britain in the Olympics and European championships and competed for England in the Commonwealth Games. Davies has attended 12 consecutive Olympic Games, competing in three games and then working in the media for the BBC Sport.

She competed in three Olympic Games over three decades, 1970s, 1980s and 1990s, in an international career spanning over 20 years.

Since retiring from the sport, she has worked for various media organisations and programmes. In 2005, Davies supported the British Olympic bid by profile-raising and appearing as spokesperson on BBC's Question Time where she made a strong case for bringing the games to London for 2012. Davies is a current patron of the Disabled Sport England and SportsAid. She was also the face of the Swim for Life charity event which raised  total over £10m for many charities.

Early life

Davies was born in Plymouth, Devon, and grew up in Plymouth and Plymstock. She has twin brothers. She attended Plymstock Comprehensive School and the private school Kelly College, which is now known as Mount Kelly, in Tavistock.

She originally learnt to swim with Devonport Royal Swimming Association. She moved to Port of Plymouth Swimming Association when she was eight and was coached for the first year first by Ray Bickley then by her father Terry Davies who became a coach. Her father was never selected as an international coach because he spoke out about East German cheating. He was added in 2021 to the Coaches Association Hall of Fame.

Swimming

She learned to swim at the age of six and was training seriously two years later.

She set a record by swimming for the British national team at the age of 11. In 1976, at age 13, Davies was selected to represent Great Britain at the 1976 Summer Olympics in Montreal. The next year she won two bronze medals in the 1977 European Championships. The following year, at age 15, she won gold medals at the Commonwealth Games in the 200 and 400-metre individual medleys and also a silver and a bronze medal.

In the 1980 Olympics, Davies took the silver medal in the 400 m individual medley behind East German Petra Schneider, who later admitted that the victory was drug enhanced.

At 18, Davies called time on the first stage of her swimming career to build her television profile and a career in modelling. In 1989, and training at Bracknell & Wokingham Swimming Club, she returned to the pool, where she picked up two more medals at the 1990 Commonwealth Games. By the time she finally retired for good in 1994, she had been a British champion on 22 occasions and had broken two hundred British swimming records and 5 World Masters records (eligible to those over 30).

Medals and awards 
Davies has broken or re broken many British records whilst competing and winning For medals table see right.

 silver medal in the 400-metre individual medley at the 1980 Olympics in Moscow
 two gold, two silver and two bronze medals at the Commonwealth Games in 1978 and 1990.
 two bronze medals at European Championships

Davies held the Commonwealth Record for 400-metre individual medley for 18 years. She has also been a World Masters Record Holder.

In the latest development in the long story of the East German state-run doping programme, The Times broke the news in 2021 that there is a possibility that the bronze and silver medals won may be upgraded to Gold.

At the ASA National British Championships she won 22 titles - the 100 metres freestyle title in 1978, 200 metres freestyle title in 1977 and 1978, 400 metres freestyle title in 1977, 1978 and 1979, 800 metres freestyle title in 1978, 200 metres backstroke title in 1976, 1977 and 1978, 200 metres medley title in 1976, 1977, 1978, 1980, 1989 and 1992, 400 metres medley title in 1976, 1977, 1978, 1979 and 1980 and the 50 metres butterfly title in 1992.

In the 1993 New Year Honours, Davies was appointed Member of the Order of the British Empire "for services to swimming".

Publications, media programmes and other work 

 In January 2022, she launched an online fitness site, Sharron Davies Training.
 Swimming biography Against the Tide published in 1984
 Dorling & Kindersley’s popular learn to swim in a weekend (which has been translated into multiple languages)
 Channel 4 television comedy series The Optimist, in an episode that was filmed entirely on location on Mexico
 This Morning - presenting a mums and babies learning to swim series on ITV
 BBC Question time – discussing the Winning Olympic Bid for London 2012 which Davies was part of.
 1996 Presented Channel 4's Big Breakfast
 1995 she joined ITV's Gladiators being given the nickname Amazon
 Presenter of Ace Reports, ITV's version of Blue Peter.
 Survived on Bear Gryll's The Island.
 Competed on ITV's Dancing on Ice
 1981 BBC series Sporting Superstars
 Guest dart player, throwing for charity, on British game show Bullseye.
 Presenting and commentating on swimming coverage for the BBC (extended to other sports for the Atlanta and Sydney Olympics.)
 2008 with Jim Rosenthal on Five's latest revival of the long running celebrity sports competition Superstars.
 2010 - ITV series Dancing on Ice, partnered by regular participant Pavel Albrecht. She was eliminated on 21 February 2010 (Week 7 of the series).
 Ski tuition video with world champion Franz Klammer, alongside fellow swimmer Duncan Goodhew. 
 1994 – a "British Girls of Sport" calendar (wearing sexy outfits to raise money for the Sports Aid Foundation).
 She was also a presenter at London's Olympics Handover Party in the Mall.

Personal life 
In the 1980s, Davies lived with and was engaged to Neil Adams an Olympic and World Championship medallist in judo.

Davies then married gym manager John Crisp in West Sussex in 1987. They were divorced in 1991.

In 1992, she met athlete Derek Redmond at the Barcelona Olympics. In 1994 they were married in Northampton, and had two children. They divorced in 2000.

Davies's third marriage was to British Airways pilot Tony Kingston. They were married in 2002 in Gloucestershire. In autumn 2006, she announced that she was three months pregnant after 8 rounds of IVF treatment, having been trying for a baby for four years and suffering two miscarriages. During a Sport Relief event in Devon, she said: "We're very optimistic and happy but we're cautious, too, because of what we have been through. Giving birth at 44 doesn't worry me. So many women go through this as they leave it later to have babies." Davies gave birth to her third child on 30 January 2007. She split up with Kingston after seven years of marriage in 2009.

Davies is a supporter of the Conservative Party and endorsed Kemi Badenoch in the July–September 2022 Conservative Party leadership election.

Trans women in sport 

In 2019, Davies entered the debate about the participation by trans women in female sporting competitions, opposing such participation and citing the biological advantage trans women hold in sports; a position supported by Olympic medal-winning sports people including Sally Gunnell, Nicola Adams, and Kelly Holmes.

In 2022, Davies stated that trans women hold a potential biological male performance advantage at the elite level of 10-20% over cisgender females and called for women's sport to exclude XY chromosome athletes. In March, she wrote a column for The Times arguing that "trans women's" advantage is the result of going through male puberty, resulting in narrower angle between the hips and knees which testosterone reduction does not eliminate, and called for trans women to compete in an open category rather than being excluded from competition entirely. In the same article, she stated: "This month we saw an athlete, Lia Thomas, who was an average club swimmer as a man claim an NCAA title as the US No 1 woman with 20 years of male development in the tank."

See also

 List of Olympic medalists in swimming (women)
 List of Commonwealth Games medallists in swimming (women)

References

External links
 Sharron Davies's official homepage
 
 On Davies's 1998 appeal to the IOC
 

1962 births
Living people
Commonwealth Games gold medallists for England
Commonwealth Games silver medallists for England
Commonwealth Games bronze medallists for England
English people of Welsh descent
English female swimmers
English television presenters
European Aquatics Championships medalists in swimming
British female freestyle swimmers
Female medley swimmers
Members of the Order of the British Empire
Olympic swimmers of Great Britain
People educated at Kelly College
Sportspeople from Plymouth, Devon
Sports commentators
Swimmers at the 1976 Summer Olympics
Swimmers at the 1978 Commonwealth Games
Swimmers at the 1980 Summer Olympics
Swimmers at the 1992 Summer Olympics
Medalists at the 1980 Summer Olympics
Olympic silver medallists for Great Britain
Olympic silver medalists in swimming
Commonwealth Games medallists in swimming
Conservative Party (UK) people
Medallists at the 1978 Commonwealth Games